Bleasby railway station serves the village of Bleasby, Nottinghamshire, England. It is on the Nottingham to Lincoln Line, owned by Network Rail and managed by East Midlands Railway.

History

The station was opened on 4 August 1846 by the Midland Railway. The original station buildings were designed by Thomas Chambers Hine. The station was taken over by the London, Midland and Scottish Railway in 1923, and by British Rail in 1948.

It is now managed by East Midlands Railway.

Stationmasters

George Williamson ca. 1857 - 1886
James B. Palmer 1886 - 1891
Job Frederick Fisher 1891 - 1898 (formerly station master at Bolsover Castle, afterwards station master at Thurgarton)
Arthur Edward Kind 1898 - 1899 (afterwards station master at Collingham)
Ebenezer Tagg 1900 - 1904
George Ernest Aiers 1904 - 1907(afterwards station master at Lowdham)
George Butler from 1907 (formerly station master at Lowdham)
George Stapleton ca. 1911
G.W. Jay ca. 1914
J.J. Williams from 1921  
Mr. Holden until 1932 (afterwards station master at Ullesthorpe) 
William George Dudderidge 1932 - 1936  (also station master at Rolleston Junction and Fiskerton)
Arnold Foster 1936 - 1942
H.J. Lane until 1947
F.W.E. Clarke from 1947 (formerly stationmaster at Widmerpool)

Facilities
The station is unstaffed and offers limited facilities other than two shelters, bicycle storage, timetables and modern help points. The full range of tickets can be purchased from the guard on the train at no extra cost as there are no retail facilities at this station.

Gallery

Services
All services at Bleasby are operated by East Midlands Railway.

The typical off-peak service is:
 1 train every 2 hours to  via 
 1 train every 2 hours to 

References

External links

Railway stations in Nottinghamshire
DfT Category F2 stations
Former Midland Railway stations
Newark and Sherwood
Railway stations in Great Britain opened in 1848
Railway stations served by East Midlands Railway
Thomas Chambers Hine railway stations